The 1927–28 Ole Miss Rebels men's basketball team represented the University of Mississippi during the 1927–28 NCAA men's basketball season in the United States. The team won the SoCon conference tournament. Ary Phillips was on the team.

References

Ole Miss Rebels men's basketball seasons